Frederick John Rodney Warner (January 7, 1855 – February 13, 1886) was an American professional baseball third baseman.

Biography
Warner played in Major League Baseball (MLB) from 1875 through 1884 for the Philadelphia Centennials, Philadelphia Athletics, Indianapolis Blues, Cleveland Blues, Philadelphia Quakers, and Brooklyn Atlantics. 

Warner died at the age of 31 in his hometown of Philadelphia, Pennsylvania, and was interred at The Woodlands Cemetery.

References

External links

1855 births
1886 deaths
Baseball players from Philadelphia
Major League Baseball third basemen
19th-century baseball players
Philadelphia Centennials players
Philadelphia Athletics (NL) players
Indianapolis Blues players
Cleveland Blues (NL) players
Philadelphia Quakers players
Brooklyn Atlantics (AA) players
Burials at The Woodlands Cemetery
19th-century deaths from tuberculosis
Tuberculosis deaths in Pennsylvania